The Pakistan men's national tennis team represent Pakistan in Davis Cup tennis competition and are governed by the Pakistan Tennis Federation.

Pakistan currently compete in the Asia/Oceania Zone of Group I. They reached the World Group Play-offs in 2005, and reached the Eastern Zone final in 1984.

Current team (2022) 

 Muzammil Murtaza
 Aqeel Khan
 Muhammad Shoaib
 Muhammad Abid
 Aisam-ul-Haq Qureshi (Captain-player)

See also
 Davis Cup
 Pakistan Fed Cup team

References

External links

Davis Cup teams
Davis Cup
Davis Cup